is a railway station in the city of Nanao, Ishikawa, Japan, operated jointly by West Japan Railway Company (JR West) and the private railway operator Noto Railway.

Lines

Station layout
The station has two opposed ground-level side platforms connected by a footbridge. The station has a "Midori no Madoguchi" staffed ticket office.

Platforms

Adjacent stations

History
The station opened on 15 December 1925, as simply . It was renamed Wakuraonsen on 1 July 1980. With the privatization of JNR on 1 April 1987, the station came under the control of JR West.

Passenger statistics
In fiscal 2015, the JR West portion of the station was used by an average of 626 passengers daily and the Noto Railway portion of the station was used by an average of 263 passengers daily (boarding passengers only).

Surrounding area
 Wakura Onsen

See also
 List of railway stations in Japan

References

External links

JR West - Wakuraonsen Station 
Noto Railway - Wakuraonsen Station 

Railway stations in Ishikawa Prefecture
Stations of West Japan Railway Company
Railway stations in Japan opened in 1925
Nanao Line
Nanao, Ishikawa